Foley Field is a baseball stadium in Athens, Georgia, United States. It is the home field of the University of Georgia Bulldogs college baseball team.  The stadium holds 3,291 people.

Foley Field was built in 1966.  The stadium was renovated in 1990, the same year that the University of Georgia won the College World Series in Omaha, Nebraska.  Since that renovation, Georgia owns a 378–193–1 (.660) record there (through the 2006 season).

Foley Field hosted the 1987 Southeastern Conference baseball tournament, won by Mississippi State.

More recently, Foley Field has hosted four NCAA regional tournaments in 2001, 2004, 2006, 2008, and in 2018.  In all four years, the Bulldogs' baseball team advanced to the College World Series.  Super Regionals were also hosted in 2001 featuring Florida State University, in 2006 against the University of South Carolina, and in 2008 with North Carolina State University as the guest.  All three super regionals were won by Georgia, two games to one.  The Bulldogs own a record of 20–7 in NCAA post season games held at Foley Field.  They also set a 16–0 mark in elimination games with a 17–8 win on June 8, 2008, to earn a trip to Johnny Rosenblatt Stadium.

Several attendance records have been set in recent years, including in both Super Regionals hosted by the stadium.  First, 7th-ranked Georgia defeated 10th-ranked Florida State 8–7 in front of 4,290 spectators on June 2, 2001.  Then, on June 12, 2006, 6th-ranked Georgia defeated 15th-ranked South Carolina in front of 4,302 spectators.  The most recent record set was during the regular season on March 21, 2009, as 3rd-ranked Georgia defeated Mississippi State 4–0 in front of 4,461 spectators.

In 2013, the Bulldogs ranked 35th among Division I baseball programs in attendance, averaging 1,940 per home game.

See also
 List of NCAA Division I baseball venues

References

External links

 Video Tour of Foley Field
University of Georgia Athletics UGA official Athletic dept
GeorgiaDogs.com official UGA sports site

Baseball venues in Georgia (U.S. state)
College baseball venues in the United States
Georgia Bulldogs baseball venues
University of Georgia campus
1966 establishments in Georgia (U.S. state)
Sports venues completed in 1966